Gabriel Valentini da Silva (born 26 September 2000), commonly known as Gabriel Valentini, is a Brazilian footballer who plays for Al Arabi as a midfielder.

Career statistics

Club

Notes

References

2000 births
Living people
Brazilian footballers
Association football midfielders
Campeonato Brasileiro Série B players
UAE Pro League players
UAE First Division League players
Esporte Clube Juventude players
Al-Nasr SC (Dubai) players
Dibba FC players
Al-Arabi SC (UAE) players
Expatriate footballers in the United Arab Emirates
Brazilian expatriate sportspeople in the United Arab Emirates